Jamie Peter Robinson (born 7 April 1980 in Penarth, Wales) is a retired Wales international rugby union footballer who played at outside centre. He attended Ysgol Gyfun Gymraeg Glantaf with younger brother Nick Robinson.  He speaks Welsh fluently.

Robinson came to prominence playing for the Cardiff Blues. He played for Wales Under 19s, Under 21s, Wales A and played in the Youth World Cup in 1999 when Wales reached the final, losing to New Zealand along with fellow Cardiff Blues player Rhys Williams. Before playing his first match for Wales against Japan in 2001 where he scored a try on his debut. He maintained a place in the Wales squad until he got injured.

He suffered a long lay off through a knee injury at the beginning of the 2004–05 Celtic League, returning to action in the middle of the 2005–06 Celtic League. He immediately recovered his best form, leading to him gaining a place in the Wales squad to Argentina where he started both tests scoring one try. This was not the first time he and his brother Nicky, played together for Wales.  They played their first test together against Ireland at Lansdowne Road in August 2003 in a Rugby World Cup warm-up fixture.

Robinson left the Blues following the 2008–09 Magners League, signing with the ambitious Top 14 side Toulon. After the 2009–10 Top 14 season, he was linked with a possible return to the Celtic League with Italian expansion team Aironi, but ultimately decided to stay in France, signing with newly promoted Agen for the 2010–11 Top 14 season.

After three seasons with Agen, Robinson was forced to end his playing career in May 2013 because of injury, bringing an end to almost 15 years in professional rugby.

References

External links
Cardiff profile
Wales profile
Scrum.com player statistics

1980 births
Living people
Alumni of the University of Glamorgan
British expatriates in France
Cardiff Rugby players
Expatriate rugby union players in France
People educated at Ysgol Gyfun Gymraeg Glantaf
RC Toulonnais players
Rugby union centres
Rugby union players from Penarth
Wales international rugby union players
Welsh expatriate rugby union players
Welsh rugby union players